The following is a list of mayors of the city of Florianópolis, in the state of Santa Catarina, Brazil.

 , 1889-1890 
 João Francisco Régis Júnior, 1890 
 João Martins Barbosa, 1890
 , 1890
 , 1890-1891, 1899-1900, 1901
 , 1891, 1892
 , 1891, 1899, 1900-1901
 , 1891, 1893-1894, 1902-1906, 1906-1907, 1907-1911 
 João Custódio Fonseca, 1891	
 , 1892
 , 1893, 1906	
 Henrique Monteiro de Abreu, 1894-1898	
 , 1899
 , 1899-1900, 1901
 Francisco Campos da Fonseca Lobo, 1901-1902
 , 1906, 1919-1920
 , 1907
 José Bueno Vilela, 1911
 , 1911-1912
 , 1912, 1913, 1914-1915, 1917-1918, 1933-1935 
 , 1912-1913
 , 1914, 1915-1917, 1918
 , 1922-1923, 1923-1924
 , 1923
 André Wendhausen Júnior, 1924
 , 1924-1926
 , 1926-1930
 José da Costa Moellmann, 1930-1933 
 João Batista da Costa Ferreira, 1933
 , 1935
 , 1935-1937
 , 1937-1938, 1938-1941
 , 1938
 , 1941
 , 1941-1945
 , 1945-1947
 Adalberto Tolentino de Carvalho, 1947-1951	
 , 1951-1954
 , 1954-1959
 , 1959, 1975
 Osvaldo Machado, 1959-1961, 1962-1964	
 Waldemar Vieira, 1961-1962		
 Dakir Polidoro, 1964	
 , 1964-1966
 , 1966-1970
 Nagib Jabor, 1970, 1978-1979
 , 1970-1973
 , 1973-1975
 Waldemar Joaquim da Silva Filho Caruso, 1975
 Esperidião Amin, 1975-1978, 1989-1990
 Francisco de Assis Cordeiro, 1979-1983
 , 1983-1984
 , 1984-1985
 , 1985
 , 1986-1988
 , 1990-1992	
 , 1993-1996 
 , 1997-2004
 Dário Berger, 2005-2012	
 , 2013-2016 
 , 2017-

See also
 Elections in Florianópolis (in Portuguese)
 Florianópolis history
 
 Santa Catarina history (state)
 
 List of mayors of largest cities in Brazil (in Portuguese)
 List of mayors of capitals of Brazil (in Portuguese)

References

This article incorporates information from the Portuguese Wikipedia.

Florianopolis